Woodrow Maxwell Melvin Sr. (December 16, 1912 – November 25, 1994) was an American politician in the state of Florida.

He served in the Florida State Senate from 1953 to 1955 as a Democratic member for the 1st district. He also served briefly in the Florida House of Representatives, from 1947 to 1952 for Santa Rosa County.

References

1912 births
1994 deaths
Democratic Party members of the Florida House of Representatives
Democratic Party Florida state senators
Pork Chop Gang
20th-century American politicians